Lilli Laursen is a former women's cricketer for the Denmark national women's cricket team who played three ODIs during the 1989 Women's European Cricket Cup. She scored 41 runs, including 24 on her debut, against Ireland.

References

Danish women cricketers
Denmark women One Day International cricketers
Living people
Year of birth missing (living people)